The Parliament of Jamaica is the legislative branch of the government of Jamaica. It consists of three elements: The Crown (represented by the Governor-General), the appointed Senate and the directly elected House of Representatives.

The Senate, the Upper House, is the direct successor of a pre-Independence body known as the "Legislative Council" and comprises 21 senators appointed by the Governor-General: thirteen on the advice of the Prime Minister and eight on the advice of the Leader of the Opposition.

The House of Representatives, the Lower House, is made up of 63 (previously 60) Members of Parliament, elected to five-year terms on a first-past-the-post basis in single-seat constituencies.

Overview
As Jamaica is a parliamentary democracy modelled after the Westminster system, most of the government's ability to make and pass laws is dependent on the Prime Minister's ability to command the confidence of the members of the House of Representatives. Though both Houses of Parliament hold political significance, the House of Representatives, of which the Prime Minister and the Leader of the Opposition are both required to be members of, holds a more powerful and prestigious role since it is the main source of legislation.

Parliament building
The Parliament meets at Gordon House at 81 Duke Street, Kingston.  It was built in 1960 and named in memory of Jamaican patriot George William Gordon.

Construction on a new parliament building directly north of Gordon House was expected to start in early 2021. However, the start of construction has been delayed until at least 2022.

House of Representatives

The House of Representatives is the Lower House. It is the group of elected members of parliament.

Members

Senate

The Senate is the Upper House. The current members are:

Jamaica Labour Party:
 Thomas George Lewis Tavares-Finson, JP, President	
 Aubyn Rochester Hill, Deputy President	
 Kamina Elizabeth Johnson Smith, Leader of Government Business	
 Ruel Bancroft Reid, CD, JP	
 Pearnel Patroe Charles, Jnr
 Ransford Braham	
 Kavan Anthony Gayle	
 Dr. Sapphire Inderea Longmore	
 Kerensia Alicia Morrison	
 Matthew Peter Samuda	
 Charles Anthony Sinclair	
 Donald George Wehby	
 Delroy Hugh Williams	

People's National Party:
 Mark Jefferson Golding, Leader of Opposition Business	
 Keith Desmond St. Aubyn Knight, OJ, QC	
 Floyd Emerson Morris	
 Dr. Angela Rosemarie Brown-Burke	
 Wensworth Kirkpatrick Skeffery	
 Sophia Lilleth Fraser-Binns	
 Lambert Alexander Brown, CD	
 Noel Bancroft Sloley, CD 

In order to effect changes to the Constitution of Jamaica a two-thirds majority in both Houses is required. Therefore, changes to the Jamaican constitution will require consensus among Government and Opposition Senators.

Last election

See also
List of presidents of the Jamaican Council
List of presidents of the Legislative Council of Jamaica
List of presidents of the Senate of Jamaica
List of speakers of the House of Representatives of Jamaica
Women in the House of Representatives of Jamaica
Jamaican Parliamentary by-elections
Politics of Jamaica
List of legislatures by country

References

External links
Parliament of Jamaica

Jamaica
Government of Jamaica
Jamaica
Jamaica
Parliament of Jamaica